Christian of Sweden - Swedish: Kristian - may refer to:

Christian I, King of Sweden 1457
Christian II, King of Sweden 1520